Tyler Brad Majeski (born August 18, 1994) is an American professional stock car racing driver. He competes full-time in the NASCAR Craftsman Truck Series, driving the No. 98 Ford F-150 for ThorSport Racing, as well as in late model racing. He has also competed in the NASCAR Xfinity Series, ARCA Menards Series, and ARCA Menards Series West in the past.

Majeski is a member of the 2016 NASCAR Next class, and was previously a development driver for Roush Fenway Racing. He raced in three NASCAR Xfinity Series races for the team in 2017 and twelve in 2018, all of which came in their No. 60 car. Majeski was left without a ride when Roush closed down their Xfinity team after the season. He then returned to ARCA in 2019 to drive part-time for Chad Bryant Racing, winning three races in six starts, which landed him a full-time ride in the Truck Series with Niece Motorsports in 2020, which he would be released from during the season, after which he landed at ThorSport in 2021.

He won four consecutive championships in the ARCA Midwest Tour in 2014 (that year, he was also the series' Rookie of the Year), 2015, 2016, and 2017. He returned to win the 2021 championship.

Racing career

Early years (2004–2011)

Majeski was born on August 18, 1994, and began racing as a nine-year-old on dirt karts in 2004 at Hi-Go Raceway near his hometown of Seymour, Wisconsin. Majeski's first win came on his tenth birthday. In his first eight races, he had won three features. He eventually was racing at several different tracks in his home area: GSR Kartway near Clintonville, Wisconsin, Hi-Go Raceway in Cecil, Wisconsin and Meadowview Kartway by Hilbert, Wisconsin. Between 2005 and 2009, he won five track titles and 84 features. By the time he turned 15, he had won a national championship in the Mid-American National Series. In karting, he had won six national championships, three state championships, and five track titles. In 2009, Majeski took second overall in the National Indoor Championship at Batesville, Mississippi; he won three of five events which caught the attention of Bobby Waltrip, the brother of Darrell and Michael Waltrip. In 2009, Waltrip arranged for Majeski to test an asphalt late model race car at Hickory Motor Speedway. After Majeski got used to driving the car, he was posting lap times quicker that the car's normal driver; Waltrip wanted Majeski to move to North Carolina for the 2009 racing season but his family did not want to move.

Majeski ended up remaining in Wisconsin and started racing limited late models in Wisconsin at Pathfinder Racing Chassis / JJ Motorsports Racing as a teammate to Ross Kenseth. He raced a various tracks for the 2010 season including Columbus 151 Speedway, Dells Raceway Park, and Madison International Speedway with former NASCAR Busch Series driver Jason Schuler as his crew chief. Majeski joined the Big 8 Late Model Series tour in 2011. He won three races including the Big 8 race at the National Short Track Championship weekend at Rockford Speedway.

ARCA Midwest Tour/TUNDRA Late Models (2012–2016)
He progressed to racing Super Late Models in 2012. In 2013, he raced 27 events in four cars for four different owners. In the season, Majeski record his first ARCA Midwest Tour pole position at Marshfield Motor Speedway. He won three races at the Oktoberfest race weekend at the LaCrosse Fairgrounds Speedway.

Majeski raced for the ARCA Midwest Tour Rookie of the Year title in 2014. He achieved his first tour victory at Illiana Motor Speedway in May 2014. That season, he also ran occasional selected weekly races at State Park Speedway on Thursdays, and LaCrosse Fairgrounds Speedway on Saturday nights, TUNDRA Super Late Model Series events, and the three Red, White, and Blue series races at Wisconsin International Raceway. Majeski also won at Hawkeye Downs Speedway in July 2014. He was awarded the series' the Rookie of the Year title along with the ARCA Midwest Tour championship in 2014, becoming the series' youngest champion. At the 2014 Snowball Derby, Majeski started 32nd and moved his way up to a 19th-place finish. He had a total of five victories in 35 races that year.

Majeski was named one of the seven finalists for the inaugural Alan Kulwicki Driver Development Program in 2015. Participants were awarded $7777 to help develop their careers. He raced a similar schedule in 2015, starting with a seven-night series at New Smyrna Speedway for the World Series of Asphalt Stock Car Racing. Majeski won the second program on Tuesday night and lead the series points for two nights. In July 2015, Speed51.com had ranked him No. 4 on their short track power ranking with seven victories. At the Slinger Nationals, Majeski started 20th and passed up to second place. While battling for the lead near the end of the race, he got into an incident while trying to pass a lapped car and restarted at the back of the lead lap cars to finish fourth.

Majeski raced four times during the LaCrosse Oktoberfest weekend; he won the late model feature on Thursday night, the Dick Trickle 99 on Friday night, and the JMcK 63 Big 8 Series race on Saturday night. With 10 laps to go, he was leading the ARCA Midwest Tour race on Sunday when a vapor lock caused his car to temporarily lose power on a restart; he finished third. Majeski traveled across the United States to Florida for the Governor's Cup at New Smyrna Speedway in November. He started 27th. After passing up through the entire field, Majeski held off Steven Wallace on numerous restarts to take the win. Dale Earnhardt Jr. tweeted about Majeski's win calling him "the Deal". At the Snowball Derby, Majeski qualified second quickest and was awarded the pole position after Christopher Bell's Kyle Busch Motorsports entry was disqualified.

The Kulwicki Driver Development Program (KDDP) named him their inaugural winner. In 56 events, he had 18 wins, 19 pole positions, and 48 Top 10 finishes. Speed51 ranked him No. 3 on their final short track season rankings behind Whelen Modified Tour winner Doug Coby and Lucas Oil Late Model Dirt Series champion Jonathan Davenport. ESPN featured Majeski as the main driver to watch in the future in an off-season article as it described him accepting the KDDP trophy.

He started the 2016 season in February in the World Series of Asphalt Stock Car Racing at New Smyrna, a week-long series of racing over Speedweeks. Majeski won the second night and the final night to capture three total wins and the Speedweeks title. He finished first or second in all six series events with an average finish of 1.5. He followed the series by racing in another southern race; he quickly went from a seventh place start to the lead as he dominated to win the Rattler 250 race at South Alabama Speedway. Speed51.com rated Majeski as its No. 1 Short Track Draft pick in May 2016. That month he won the first race of the ARCA Midwest Tour, the Joe Shear Memorial at Madison International Speedway, over Johnny Sauter. In May, he joined Roush Fenway Racing's driver development program. He was one of eleven drivers named to the NASCAR Next 2016–2017 class on the following day. In June 2016, Majeski made his first ARCA start in the No. 17 Roulo Brothers Racing car. He had the fastest time in practice, started seventh, raced up to second, and finished fourth. For the season, Majeski won 9 of 10 races at LaCrosse plus had several high finishes at Madison. Majeski noticed that he was high in the NASCAR Whelen All-American Series national points in August despite not intentionally racing for any track's points championship. The driver's top 18 finishes determine their standings. He made a late season decision to try for the national title. He started double features at Elko Speedway and climbed to tenth in the standings. On the following weekend he won the another feature at Madison for his 13th NASCAR weekly win of the season to climb to third in the standings. He raced more at Elko and Rockford Speedway but finished third in the final points standings. 

Majeski ended the season by winning the Oktoberfest main event at LaCrosse to earn his third consecutive ARCA Midwest Tour championship. He returned to New Smyrna Speedway and qualified on the pole position for the Governor's Cup. He fell nearly two laps down during the race and came back to win for the second consecutive year.

National touring series (2017–present)

Majeski moved to Charlotte, North Carolina in early 2017 to work in the Roush organization as an engineer. He reportedly was close to securing a Ford development contract but ARCA champion Chase Briscoe received the contract since he had more large track experience. He began the season racing in the World Series of Asphalt at New Smyrna. Majeski won his second consecutive Rattler 250 over Harrison Burton and Steven Wallace. In March 2017, Majeski announced he would be making his NASCAR Xfinity Series debut at Iowa Speedway in June, followed by a part-time schedule in the series and ARCA. On April 24, 2017, after testing a car at Daytona International Speedway, it was announced that Majeski would run five ARCA races for Cunningham Motorsports.

In April, he returned to Wisconsin for the first asphalt race of the year; he led the last 44 laps to take the Icebreaker 100 win at Dells Raceway Park. Two months later, in his Xfinity debut at Iowa, Majeski qualified tenth and ran as high as fifth, but was involved in an accident with Kyle Benjamin on lap 114; he finished 34th. Majeski clinched his fourth consecutive ARCA Midwest Tour at Elko Speedway with one race remaining for the season. Majeski won his third consecutive Governor's Cup in a Super Late Model at New Smyra Speedway in November over Bubba Pollard, Wallace, and Burton. He returned to the Xfinity Series at Iowa and the season finale at Homestead-Miami.

Roush Fenway Racing announced that Majeski would share the No. 60 car with Chase Briscoe and Austin Cindric in 2018. Majeski had his first Top 10 result with a seventh-place finish at Iowa. In July 2018, he dominated to win his first Slinger Nationals.

On December 2, 2018, Majeski announced a return to Super Late Model racing after it was revealed that Roush Fenway Racing was in the process of closing its Xfinity program. He was announced as the driver for five ARCA races in the No. 22 Chad Bryant Racing car in 2019. In his second start for the team, Majeski took advantage of a late-race mistake by Michael Self to take the lead and held off Sheldon Creed for an overtime win at Charlotte Motor Speedway. He would also win the following race at Pocono Raceway. Going for three in a row at Michigan International Speedway the following week, a fuel gamble fell short on the final corner as Majeski was passed by Michael Self for the win. In July, Majeski was passed in the final corner by Matt Kenseth to finish second in the Slinger Nationals. In August, Majeski scored his first Dixieland 250 win in ARCA Midwest Tour competition at his home track, Wisconsin International Raceway. Majeski pulled away after a restart with 16 laps remaining to capture his second Oktoberfest at LaCrosse in October after a tight battle with Erik Darnell.

In November 2019, Majeski made his NASCAR Gander Outdoors Truck Series debut in the Lucas Oil 150 at ISM Raceway, driving the No. 44 truck for Niece Motorsports. During the weekend, he also ran his first NASCAR K&N Pro Series West race at the track with Chad Bryant Racing.

On December 10, 2019, it was announced that Majeski had joined Niece full-time in the team's No. 45 truck for the 2020 NASCAR Gander RV & Outdoors Truck Series season, replacing Ross Chastain. In his first race of the season, he was involved in a crash and slid on his roof in Turn 1 at Daytona. On February 16, he won his 100th Super Late Model race during the World Series of Asphalt race at New Smyrna Speedway. In July, Majeski won his second Slinger Nationals after losing some of the power steering just after half-way through the 200 lap event. He won his second consecutive Dixieland 250 ARCA Midwest Tour race at Wisconsin International Raceway in August.

On September 8, 2020, the entry list for the truck race at Richmond Raceway listed Trevor Bayne as the driver for the No. 45 instead of Majeski, who was nowhere to be found on the entry list. No statement was made as to why Majeski was not entered. Three races later, following a second-place finish at Talladega, Bayne told reporters that he would finish the season in the No. 45, effectively ending Majeski's rookie season without explanation. After qualifying on pole position at the Oktoberfest Super Late Model event at LaCrosse in October 2020, he elected to start in the back of the field for a chance to win an extra $6,300 with a victory. He took the ARCA Midwest Tour win over Rich Bickle to pocket the win money and bonus. Majeski then won the Myrtle Beach 400 Late Model race in its first year since moving to Florence Motor Speedway in Timmonsville.

In 2021, Majeski joined ThorSport Racing and would return to the Truck Series at Charlotte and Nashville in the No. 66, a part-time fifth truck for them. Majeski returned to the ARCA Midwest Tour between the NASCAR races and won the 2021 championship with a second place finish at Oktoberfest. His fifth championship set a new series record. He then repeated his Myrtle Beach 400 win in Florence.

Majeski drove the No. 66 full-time in 2022. He made the playoffs by staying consistent with seven top-fives and ten top-10 finishes. During the playoffs, Majeski won at Bristol and Homestead to lock himself in the Championship 4. He finished 20th at Phoenix after a late spin, resulting in a fourth place finish in the standings.

Personal life

Majeski graduated from Seymour Community High School in 2013.  In February 2017, Majeski moved from his home state of Wisconsin to North Carolina to be closer to the racing community. He reportedly took off a semester at UW-Madison as a senior majoring in mechanical engineering. He was the number one ranked oval player in the world for the online racing simulator iRacing from December 2016 until December 2021, which sponsors him in his racing. In early August 2018, Majeski announced his engagement to Ali VanderLoop on Twitter.

When Majeski began working at ThorSport Racing in 2021, he moved from North Carolina to Ohio (although he still kept owning his North Carolina home), since unlike most NASCAR teams, ThorSport's shop is located in Sandusky, Ohio instead of the Charlotte metropolitan area. The Thorson family (the owners of ThorSport) led Majeski to temporarily stay in the same housing development as them while he is searching for a permanent home in the area.

Motorsports career results

NASCAR
(key) (Bold – Pole position awarded by qualifying time. Italics – Pole position earned by points standings or practice time. * – Most laps led.)

Xfinity Series

Craftsman Truck Series

 Season still in progress
 Ineligible for series points

K&N Pro Series West

ARCA Menards Series
(key) (Bold – Pole position awarded by qualifying time. Italics – Pole position earned by points standings or practice time. * – Most laps led.)

References

External links
 
 Official profile at ThorSport Racing
 

1994 births
American people of Polish descent
Living people
People from Seymour, Wisconsin
Racing drivers from Wisconsin
ARCA Midwest Tour drivers
ARCA Menards Series drivers
RFK Racing drivers
Multimatic Motorsports drivers
Michelin Pilot Challenge drivers